Viktors Ščerbatihs (born 6 October 1974 in Dobele) is a former Latvian weightlifter and politician and a three-time Olympian for his native country. He is 181 cm tall.

In the 2004 Summer Olympics, he won the silver medal in the over 105 kg weight category, with the total result of 455 kg (205 kg in snatch and 250 kg in clean and jerk). He has also won three bronze medals in the World Championships (in 1997, 1998 and 2003), gold in 2007 and several medals in the European Championships (bronze in 1997, 1999 and 2000, gold in 2001, silver in 2004, and four consecutive gold medals in 2005–2008).

He started his political career with Latvian Farmers' Union in 2006 and was elected to parliament.
He became world champion in 2007.

At the 2008 Summer Olympics he won the bronze medal in the +105 kg category, with a total of 448 kg.

Notes and references 

 Viktors Ščerbatihs at Database Weightlifting (Retrieved on December 19, 2009).

1974 births
Living people
People from Dobele
Latvian Farmers' Union politicians
Deputies of the 9th Saeima
Latvian male weightlifters
Olympic weightlifters of Latvia
Latvian strength athletes
Weightlifters at the 1996 Summer Olympics
Weightlifters at the 2000 Summer Olympics
Weightlifters at the 2004 Summer Olympics
Weightlifters at the 2008 Summer Olympics
Olympic silver medalists for Latvia
Olympic bronze medalists for Latvia
Latvian sportspeople in doping cases
Olympic medalists in weightlifting
Medalists at the 2008 Summer Olympics
Medalists at the 2004 Summer Olympics
European Weightlifting Championships medalists
World Weightlifting Championships medalists
21st-century Latvian people